Ffestiniog is a community in Gwynedd in Wales, containing several villages, in particular the settlements of Llan Ffestiniog and Blaenau Ffestiniog.  It has a population of 4,875.

History

Ffestiniog was a parish in Cantref Ardudwy; in 1284, Ardudwy became part of the county of Merionethshire, which became an administrative county in 1888.
Mary Evans (1735–89) founded a sect in Ffestiniog around 1780, whose believers held that she had married Christ in a ceremony held in Ffestiniog church. The sect soon died out after her death. 
The parish was created an urban district in 1894.  On 1 April 1974, under the Local Government Act 1972, Ffestiniog Urban District was abolished, becoming merged with other districts to form Meirionnydd District, which was itself abolished in 1996.  Ffestiniog became a community with an elected town council.

Ffestiniog Golf Club was founded in 1893.  The club closed at the end of March 2014.

Toponymy 
Celtic place-name in *-ākon "place of", then, "place belonging to, territory of" > Old Welsh -auc, -awg > Welsh -og. The form -iog with an additional /i/ can be explained by the preceding element, which is a personal name ending with -i-us : Festinius. The whole name should be *Festiniākon. Probably same name as Festigny (France, e.g.: Festigny, Marne, Festiniacus in 853)

See also
 Festiniog and Blaenau Railway
 Ffestiniog power station
 Ffestiniog Railway

References

External links

 
Communities in Gwynedd
The Slate Landscape of Northwest Wales

cy:Ffestiniog